Riza ( meaning roots, outside Aetolia-Acarnania: Riza Nafpaktias) is a settlement in Aetolia-Acarnania, Greece. It is part of the community of Makyneia, within the municipality of Nafpaktia. According to 2011 census, it had 160 inhabitants.

Geography
Riza is situated at the foot of the mountain Klokova, near the northeast coast of the Gulf of Patras, 6 km northwest of Antirrio. Its elevation is 50 m amsl. The Greek National Road 5 (Antirrio-Agrinio-Ioannina), which has recently been bypassed by the Motorway 5, passes through the village. In the vicinity there is a thermal spring where the water heats to 37 °C at 255 m depth and is rich in hydrogen sulfide.

History
Riza was an independent community between 1912 and 1916. It was part of the community of Mamako (after 1980: Makyneia) between 1916 and 1989, when it became part of the municipality Antirrio. It became part of Nafpaktia in 2011.

Historical population

References

Populated places in Aetolia-Acarnania
Nafpaktia
Ancient Greek cities
Ancient Aetolia